Ogygioses eurata is a species of moth of the family Palaeosetidae. It is only known from Taiwan.

References

Moths described in 1932
Hepialoidea